Silhouette in Red is the tenth studio album by Welsh singer Bonnie Tyler. It was released on 11 October 1993, through Hansa Records. The album became Tyler's final collaboration with German producer Dieter Bohlen.

The album was released in mainland Europe and was a commercial success. The album was certified Gold in Norway through pre-sales, one day before it was released.

Background 
Silhouette in Red was Tyler's third and final release with Hansa Records, following Bitterblue (1991) and Angel Heart (1992).

Writing and recording 
Twelve of the album's fifteen tracks were recorded with Dieter Bohlen and Studio 33 in Hamburg, Germany. On 5 July 1993, Tyler and Bohlen were interviewed in the recording studio for an episode of Bravo TV on RTL 2. The Royal London Philharmonic Orchestra feature on "Stay" and "Silhouette in Red", with arrangements by Werner Becker. Luis Rodríguez co-produced four of the album's tracks with Bohlen. Bohlen wrote "Bad Dreams" as an homage to "Black Velvet" by Alannah Myles.

Tyler's cover of "You Are So Beautiful", made famous by Joe Cocker in 1974, was recorded at Matrix Studios in London with producer Gene Capell. Tyler reunited with former band mates Kevin Dunne, Ray "Taff Williams" and Pete King to record "Before We Get Any Closer" and "You Won't See Me Cry". The former was written and produced by Ronnie Scott, Tyler's former manager and writer of "It's a Heartache", and the latter track was co-written by Tyler's brother, Paul Hopkins.

Release and promotion
Silhouette in Red was released on 13 October 1993 through Hansa Records; it became the final album by Tyler to be released under the label before she moved to EastWest Records in 1994. It became Tyler's first studio album not to receive a vinyl release, with physical releases limited to CD and cassette. "Sally Comes Around" was released as the album's lead single in October 1993, and the album's only charting single with a peak at no. 76 in Germany. "From the Bottom of My Lonely Heart", "You Are So Beautiful" and "Stay" were released later. Despite reduced sales compared to her previous two albums, Silhouette in Red was still certified Gold in Norway based on pre-orders alone. It was later updated to Platinum for sales of over 50,000 units.

In 1994, Tyler embarked on a 47-date tour in support of the album beginning at the Audimax in Regensburg, Germany on 20 January and concluding in Copenhagen, Denmark on 29 March 1994, with dates in Austria, Belgium, Czech Republic, Denmark, France, Germany, Hungary, Norway, Slovakia, Slovenia,, Sweden and Switzerland.

Critical reception 
In a positive review, AllMusic named "Sally Comes Around", "Send Me the Pillow" and "You Won't See Me Cry" as the album's highlights.

Track listing 

Notes
  signifies a pseudonym for Dieter Bohlen
  signifies an additional arranger
  signifies an additional producer

Charts

Certifications

Industry awards 
The Bravo Otto is a German accolade honoring excellence of performers in film, television and music. The awards are presented annually and voted by readers of Bravo magazine. Silhouette in Red was nominated for Best CD of 1993 in the Female Singers' category, and came in 9th with 1.84% of the vote. The Very Best of Bonnie Tyler, a compilation album released earlier in the year, came in 8th place.

Personnel 
Credits adapted from liner notes.

Musicians 

 Bonnie Tyler – lead vocals
 John Young – keyboards (1-12), programming (1-12)
 Richard Cottle – keyboards (13)
 Pete King – synthesizer programming (14), string programming (14), guitars (14), drum programming (14)
 Dick Roberts – keyboards (14), synthesizer programming (14), string programming (14), drum programming (14)
 Lee Morris – keyboards (15), drums (15), strings (15)
 Alan Darby – guitars (1-13), all instruments (introduction on 2)
 Ray "Taff" Williams – guitars (14, 15), backing vocals (15)
 Ed Poole – bass (1-13, 15)
 Kevin Dunne – bass (14)
 John Tonks – drums (1-13)
 Royal Philharmonic Orchestra – orchestra (3, 6)
 Adrian Revell – saxophone (15)
 Gerard Presencer – trumpet (15)
 Dieter Bohlen – arrangements (1-12)
 Werner Becker – additional arrangements (3, 6, 12)
 Paul Hopkins – backing vocals (15)

Technical 
 Pete – engineer (14)
 Nigel – engineer (14)
 Sam – engineer (14)
 Dave "Deptford" Pine – engineer (15)

Design 
 David Aspden – management
 Ariola – design
 a-r-t-p-o-o-l – design
 Thomas Sassenbach – art direction
 Andreas Kess – photography

Notes

References 

 

1993 albums
Bonnie Tyler albums
Hansa Records albums